The 1951 New York Giants season was the franchise's 69th season and saw the Giants finish the regular season in a tie for first place in the National League with a record of 96 wins and 58 losses. This prompted a three-game playoff against the Brooklyn Dodgers, which the Giants won in three games, clinched by Bobby Thomson's walk-off home run, a moment immortalized as the Shot Heard 'Round the World. The Giants, however, lost the 1951 World Series to the New York Yankees in six games.

Offseason

Spring training 
The Giants had trained in Phoenix since 1947. In 1951, the team swapped spring training sites with the New York Yankees, with the Yankees moving to Phoenix and the Giants training at Al Lang Field in St. Petersburg, Florida. It was a one-year arrangement and the Giants would return to Phoenix in 1952.

Notable transactions 
 December 4, 1950: Tom Acker was drafted from the Giants by the Buffalo Bisons in the 1950 minor league draft.
 Prior to 1951 season (exact date unknown)
Dom Zanni was signed as an amateur free agent by the Giants.
Don Taussig was acquired by the Giants from the New York Yankees.

Regular season
Center fielder Willie Mays made his major league debut in a game against the Philadelphia Phillies on May 25. He went on to win the 1951 National League Rookie of the Year Award.

Outfielder Monte Irvin led the league in RBI with 121. Five players on the 1951 Giants team went on to become major league managers. Eddie Stanky (1952), Bill Rigney (1956), Alvin Dark (1961), Wes Westrum (1965) and Whitey Lockman (1972).

In June, future NFL Hall of Famer Andy Robustelli was offered a tryout with the New York Giants. The Giants offered Robustelli a $400 contract to play with Class AA Knoxville.

Opening Day lineup

Season standings

Record vs. opponents

The comeback 
After a slow start, the team went 50–12 over their final 62 games to complete one of the biggest comebacks in major league history. Longstanding rumors that the Giants engaged in systematic sign stealing during the second half of the 1951 season were confirmed in 2001.  Several players told The Wall Street Journal that beginning on July 20, the team used a telescope, manned by coach Herman Franks in the Giants clubhouse behind center field, to steal the finger signals of those opposing catchers who left their signs unprotected.  Stolen signs were relayed to the Giants dugout via a buzzer wire. Joshua Prager, the author of the Journal article, outlined the evidence in greater detail in a 2008 book.  He noted that sign stealing, then as now, is not specifically forbidden by MLB rules and, moral issues aside, "has been a part of baseball since its inception."

The playoff 

At the end of the season, they were tied with their arch-rivals, the Dodgers, for first place in the League, prompting a three-game playoff for the pennant. The Giants had home field advantage for the series.

Game 1 
The first game of the series was played at Ebbets Field. Jim Hearn started for the Giants against Ralph Branca for the Dodgers. Monte Irvin and Bobby Thomson homered for the Giants, powering them to a 3–1 win. Andy Pafko hit a home run for the only Dodgers run.

Game 2 
The series moved to the Polo Grounds for game two. Sheldon Jones took the mound for the Giants against the Dodgers' Clem Labine. Jones was pulled in the third inning despite giving up just two runs, one of which was a Jackie Robinson homer. However, the game went downhill from there, as the Dodgers abused relievers George Spencer and Al Corwin for eight more runs, while Labine pitched a six-hit shutout for a 10–0 shellacking. Pafko hit his second homer of the series, while Gil Hodges and Rube Walker added home runs of their own.

Game 3 
Game three was also held at the Polo Grounds. Sal "The Barber" Maglie was on the mound for New York, while Brooklyn called on Don Newcombe. After Maglie walked two batters in the top of the first, Jackie Robinson singled home the game's first run. The score remained 1–0 until the bottom of the seventh. In that inning, Monte Irvin led off with a double for the Giants. He was bunted over to third, and scored on a sacrifice fly by Bobby Thomson.

In the top of the eighth, the Dodgers came roaring back with three runs off Maglie. A pair of singles, a wild pitch, and two more singles made the score 4–1 Dodgers. Newcombe sat down the Giants in order in the bottom of the eighth, while Larry Jansen did the same in relief of Maglie.

The "shot heard 'round the world" 

In the bottom of the ninth, Alvin Dark led off with a single, and Don Mueller followed with another. After Monte Irvin popped out to first base, Whitey Lockman lined a double to left-center field, scoring Dark and putting Mueller on third. Dodger manager Chuck Dressen summoned game 1 starter Ralph Branca in to relieve Newcombe, despite having only had one day's rest. On his second pitch, Bobby Thomson drove a pitch to deep left field for a walk-off home run to clinch the pennant for the Giants. This home run, hit at 3:58 p.m. EST on October 3, 1951, came to be known as the "Shot Heard 'Round the World".

The phrase shot heard 'round the world is from a classic poem by Ralph Waldo Emerson, originally used to refer to the first clash of the American Revolutionary War and since used to apply to other dramatic moments, military and otherwise. In the case of Thomson's home run, it was particularly apt as U.S. servicemen fighting in the Korean War listened to the radio broadcast of the game.

Thomson's homer, and the Giants' victory, are also sometimes known as the Miracle of Coogan's Bluff.

Line score 
Polo Grounds

Roster

Player stats

Batting

Starters by position
Note: Pos = Position; G = Games played; AB = At bats; H = Hits; Avg. = Batting average; HR = Home runs; RBI = Runs batted in

Other batters
Note: G = Games played; AB = At bats; H = Hits; Avg. = Batting average; HR = Home runs; RBI = Runs batted in

Pitching

Starting pitchers
Note: G = Games pitched; IP = Innings pitched; W = Wins; L = Losses; ERA = Earned run average; SO = Strikeouts

Other pitchers
Note: G = Games pitched; IP = Innings pitched; W = Wins; L = Losses; ERA = Earned run average; SO = Strikeouts

Relief pitchers
Note: G = Games pitched; W = Wins; L = Losses; SV = Saves; ERA = Earned run average; SO = Strikeouts

1951 World Series

Game 1
October 4, 1951, at Yankee Stadium in New York City

Game 2
October 5, 1951, at Yankee Stadium in New York City

Game 3
October 6, 1951, at the Polo Grounds in, New York City

Game 4
October 8, 1951, at the Polo Grounds in, New York City

Game 5
October 9, 1951, at the Polo Grounds in New York City

Game 6
October 10, 1951, at Yankee Stadium in New York City

Awards and honors
Willie Mays: National League Rookie of the Year

Farm system

LEAGUE CHAMPIONS: Sioux City

References

External links
 1951 New York Giants team at Baseball-Reference
 1951 New York Giants team at Baseball Almanac

New York Giants (NL)
San Francisco Giants seasons
New York Giants season
National League champion seasons
1951 in sports in New York City
1950s in Manhattan
Washington Heights, Manhattan